Blues for Smoke is an album by pianist Jaki Byard recorded in 1960 and released on the Candid label.

Reception

Allmusic awarded the album 4½ stars with its review by Scott Yanow stating, "A highly recommended outing from a very underrated pianist".

Track listing 
All compositions by Jaki Byard
 "Journey/Hollis Stomp/Milan to Lyon" - 5:57     
 "Aluminum Baby" - 4:32     
 "Pete and Thomas (Tribute to the Ticklers)" - 3:41     
 "Spanish Tinge No 1" - 4:12     
 "Flight of the Fly" - 5:44     
 "Blues for Smoke" - 4:52     
 "Jaki's Blues Next" - 2:07     
 "Diane's Melody" - 5:05     
 "One Two Five" - 2:40

Personnel 
 Jaki Byard - piano

References 

1961 albums
Candid Records albums
Instrumental albums
Jaki Byard albums
Solo piano jazz albums